Below is a list of recipients of the Congressional Gold Medal, the highest civilian honor bestowed by the United States Congress.

Recipients of Continental Congress Gold Medals

Recipients of Congressional Gold Medals

See also
Congressional Silver Medal
Congressional Bronze Medal
Awards and decorations of the United States government

Notes

References

Sources

External links

Congressional Gold Medal recipients